Megachile taiwanicola is a species of bee in the family Megachilidae. It was described by Yasumatsu & Hirashima in 1965.

References

Taiwanicola
Insects described in 1965